Sam Tochterman-Talbott (born 5 June 1995), also known as Sam Carson, is a United States international rugby league footballer who plays as a  forward for the Tweed Heads Seagulls in the Queensland Cup. He was selected to represent the United States in the 2017 Rugby League World Cup.

References

External links
2017 RLWC profile

1995 births
Living people
Australian people of American descent
Australian rugby league players
Indigenous Australian rugby league players
Rugby league second-rows
Tweed Heads Seagulls players
United States national rugby league team players